'''Dipsas copei is a non-venomous snake found in Guyana, Suriname, French Guiana, and Venezuela.

References

Dipsas
Snakes of South America
Reptiles of Guyana
Reptiles of Suriname
Reptiles of French Guiana
Reptiles of Venezuela
Reptiles described in 1872
Taxa named by Albert Günther